Turtle Creek is an unincorporated community in Boone County, West Virginia, United States. Turtle Creek has a post office with ZIP code 25203.

A post office has been in operation in Turtle Creek since 1858. The community was named after Turtle Creek, which runs through it.

References

Unincorporated communities in Boone County, West Virginia
Unincorporated communities in West Virginia